is a Japanese voice actress and singer. Together with her friend Chika Sakamoto, she participated in the third incarnation of the radio show Animetopia. She is a member of SplashDream.

Anime

TV
Around the World in Eighty Days (Princess Romy)
Aura Battler Dunbine (Ceila Lapana)
Battle Athletes Victory (Tomoe Midō)
Flame of Recca (Mifuyu Mikagami)
Fruits Basket (Mine Kuramae)
Genesis Climber Mospeada (Aisha, Marlene Rush)
Gu-Gu Ganmo (Ayumi Ichigaya)
Highschool! Kimengumi (Yui Kawa)
Meimon! Dai San Yakyūbu (Sayuri Kidō)
Shima Shima Tora no Shimajirō (Mimi-Lynne and Hannah)
Touch (Tomoko Terashima)

OVAs
Battle Athletes Victory (Tomoe Midō)
Dōkyūsei: End of Summer (Mai Sakuragi)
Dream Hunter Rem II: Seimi Shingakuen no Yōmu (Meimi Katsuragi)
Elf Princess Reine (Reine)
Galaxy Fraulein Yuna (Yuri Cube)
Majo demo Steady (Mami)
Tenmonya Voyagers (Ayako Hanabishi)
Wanna-Be's (Eri Kazama)

Movies
Arion (Resufīna)
Highschool! Kimen-gumi (Yui Kawa)
Toire no Hanako-chan (Yoshiki Ishikawa)
Shimajirō to Fufu no Daibōken: Sukue! Nanairo no Hana (2013) (Mimi-Lynne and Hannah)
Shimajirō to Kujira no Uta (2014) (Mimi-Lynne and Hannah)
Shimajirō to Ōkina Ki (2015) (Mimi-Lynne and Hannah)
Shimajirō to Ehon no Kuni ni (2016) (Mimi-Lynne and Hannah)
Shimajirō to Niji no Oashisu (2017) (Mimi-Lynne and Hannah)
Shimajiro Mahō no Shima no Daibōken (2018) (Mimi-Lynne and Hannah)
Shimajiro to Ururu no Heroland (2019) (Mimi-Lynne and Hannah)
Shimajiro to Sora Tobufune (2021) (Mimi-Lynne and Hannah)
Shimajirō to Kirakira Ōkoku no Ōji-sama (2022) (Mimi-Lynne and Hannah)

GamesAsuka 120% (Nana Owada)Atelier Iris: Eternal Mana (Iris)Atelier Iris 2: The Azoth of Destiny (Iris)Dragon Force (Teiris)Doki Doki Poyacchio (Pia)Chūka na Janshi Tenhō Paiko (Yayoi)First Kiss Story (Hiyori Sōgetsu)Game Tengoku series (Miki)Growlanser III: The Dual Darkness (Yayoi Tachibana)Xenoblade Chronicles 2 (Vess)Idol Janshi Suchie Pai series (Yūki Mizuno)Only You: Reberukurusu (Momoki Kagami)Simple Character 2000 Series Vol.5: Highschool! Kimen-gumi: The Table Hockey (Yui Kawa)Super Robot Wars series (Shīra Rabāna)

CDsVolkslied'' (Atelier series)

External links
 Melody Café, official site (Archived)

1961 births
Japanese voice actresses
Living people